Anfoushi is a neighborhood in Alexandria, Egypt. It is considered one of the oldest neighborhoods in the city and is home to many old landmarks, including the famous Abu el-Abbas el-Mursi Mosque.

See also 

 Neighborhoods in Alexandria

Neighbourhoods of Alexandria